New York is a transitional serif typeface designed in 1983 for the Macintosh computer by Susan Kare and reworked in 1988 by Charles Bigelow and Kris Holmes. The typeface was the standard bitmap serif font for the early Macintosh operating systems. Originally titled “Ardmore”, it was  renamed to New York before its initial release as part of the "World Class Cities" naming scheme by Apple Computer cofounder Steve Jobs.

Designed as a bitmap face, New York was later released in TrueType format, though the design differed from the bitmap version.

In 2019, Apple made a new serif typeface available, also named New York, although the designs are unrelated.

See also
Apple typography
San Francisco (sans-serif typeface)

References

Apple Inc. typefaces
Transitional serif typefaces
Typefaces and fonts introduced in 1983
Typefaces designed by Susan Kare
Typefaces designed by Charles Bigelow (type designer)
Typefaces designed by Kris Holmes